Vicky the Viking, known as Wickie und die starken Männer in Germany and Austria and  in Japan, is an animated television series which tells the adventures of Vicky, a young Viking boy who uses his wits to help his Viking fellows. It is based on the novel Vicke Viking (1963) written by the Swedish author Runer Jonsson. It premiered on the German TV channel ZDF on 31 January 1974 and aired in various countries. In 2013–2014, the series also existed in 3D animation produced by Studio 100.

Plot 
The series' main character is Vicky, son of Halvar, chief of the Viking village of Flake. Unlike his village fellows - including most of the other boys of his age - Vicky has a sharp and imaginative mind which helps his fellow Vikings out of many tight situations, including rival Viking lord Sven the Terrible. Certain results of his intellectual approach shown in the series and the film adaptation include building a makeshift catapult to beat his father in a stone-ferrying contest, fitting their longship with kites to make it glide through the air, and using a small sawfish to cut an escape hole through a wooden door.

Characters 
Vicky, the series' title character, a boy of about 9 years of age. He is physically frail, timid and has a special fear of wolves, but his brains eventually help him solve any problem with which he is confronted.
Halvar, Vicky's father and chief of Flake. A rather braggish warrior, who prefers to solve problems with brawns, but who has since learned to listen to and value Vicky's ideas.
Ylva, Vicky's mother, who is far more supportive of her son's intelligence than his father is.
Tjure and Snorre, two Vikings in Halvar's crew who constantly quarrel about something.
Urobe, the village druid and oldest Viking in Halvar's crew. While he is rather old and not as imaginative as Vicky, he is quite knowledgeable in sagas and legend lore, and he is respected as a fair judge and mediator.
Faxe is the biggest and strongest, but also the slowest, of Flake's Vikings who enjoys a close big-brother relationship with Vicky.
Gorm, a rather over-excited fellow among the Flake Vikings who occupies the position of the lookout on Halvar's ship.
Ulme, the village bard, a rather neat person and poetic soul, who carries a harp to play on joyous occasions, alas invariably wasted on his Nordic barbarian audience.
Gilby, the strongest boy in Flake and Vicky's ambitious prime rival in his age, though a terrible rascal and intellectually clearly Vicky's inferior.
Ylvie (a.k.a. "Ticky" in the U.K. version), a young girl in Flake who is Vicky's neighbour and most ardent supporter. In the German movie adaptation this adoration is portrayed as a childhood crush.
Sven the Terrible, a vicious Viking pirate captain, who does not hesitate robbing even his fellow Vikings of their hard-earned plunder.
Pokka, Sven's devious second-in-command.

Production 

The script was developed from the children's book Vicke Viking (1963) written by the Swedish author Runer Jonsson, who won the Deutscher Jugendliteraturpreis (German Children's Book Award) for it in 1965. The Japanese animation studio Zuiyo Enterprise Company (from which Nippon Animation was formed) adapted the original version (1972–1974) and developed from it an 85-minute-long movie (original title: Chiisana Baikingu Bikke) as well as the series with 78 episodes, each 25 minutes long. The animation of the first episodes was commissioned by Zuiyo Eizo to Mushi Production, directed by Chikao Katsui. Following the failure of the latter, Zuiyo Eizo continued the production of the series alone hiring director Hiroshi Saitô. Later Zuiyo Eizo will split into Zuiyo Co., and Nippon Animation which will complete the rest of the episodes with director Kōzō Kusuba, while Zuiyo will maintain the rights to the series (copyright has been registered in 1972). The series' Japanese roots are clearly visible in its styling and character design - this led to the series being the first unwitting brush with Japanese animation for those who would become anime fans later in life.

Responsible for the German dubbing was Eberhard Storeck, who spoke as one of the characters (Snorre) himself. The music in the German version was composed by Christian Bruhn and Karel Svoboda. The text of the title song (Hey, hey, Wickie! Hey, Wickie, hey! ...) was written by Andrea Wagner. The German version also features new brief portions of animation. The English dubbing was largely poor, with characters talking endlessly to fit the lip movements of the characters, not pausing for a breath or using verbal punctuation. In the years that followed this was not uncommon for some voice actors who dubbed Japanese-produced series, up to the 1990s' anime boom in the West.

The series was produced for the German TV network ZDF and Austrian TV network ORF. In the United Kingdom, it was shown on ITV.

Sequel productions

TV remake 
A modern television 'remake' is entitled Vic the Viking.

Film adaptations 
German director Michael "Bully" Herbig filmed a live action adaptation of the series called Wickie The Mighty Viking (aka "Wickie und die starken Männer").  It was produced by Christian Becker of Rat Pack Filmproduktion for a 2009 release.
Vicky is portrayed by Jonas Hämmerle. Günther Kaufmann portrays Sven, the antagonist of the Vikings. The Vikings of Flake are portrayed by Jörg Moukkadam (Faxe), Mike Maas (Gorm), Christian Koch (Snorre), Nic Romm (Tjure), Patrick Reichel (Ulme) and Olaf Krätke (Urobe).

The film premiered on 9 September 2009, in Munich. On its opening weekend, it grossed approximately $5,595,895. On 3 October, during a show of Wetten, dass..?, Herbig was presented with the Goldene Leinwand award for the film's viewership of three million within its first 18 weeks. The film sold nearly 5 million tickets in Germany, for a total gross revenue of approximately $40,582,384.

Following the success of the first film,  a sequel, Wickie auf Großer Fahrt, was released on 29 September 2011.

A CG animated film Vic the Viking: The Magic Sword was released on December 8, 2019.

Legacy 
Christian Lorenz, keyboardist of the industrial metal band Rammstein took his nickname ("Flake") from the village of the same name in Vicky the Viking, which he watched as a child.
Japanese manga artist Eiichiro Oda was heavily influenced by the program, which led him to serialize One Piece in Shueisha's Weekly Shōnen Jump anthology magazine starting in 1997.
Japanese manga artist Makoto Yukimura has cited Vicky the Viking as an inspiration for his series Vinland Saga, particularly in the case of the character Hild.

VHS release (United Kingdom) 
 In the UK on 14 May 1990, Video Collection International Ltd released a single video cassette of Vicky The Viking (Cat. No. VC1177) with the first two episodes that were "The Contest" and "The Trap" and it was re-released on 22 July 1991 in Video Collection International Ltd's "Children's Club" range of kids tiles (Cat. No. KK0013).

Primary literature (German) 
Runer Jonsson: Wickie und die starken Männer. München: Herold 1964.
Runer Jonsson: Wickie und die Blauschwerter. München: Herold. 1966.
Runer Jonsson: Wickie und die großen Drachen. München: Herold. 1967.
Runer Jonsson: Wickie und die Rothäute. Ravensburg: Ravensburger Buchvlg. 1984. 
Runer Jonsson: Wickie und das hölzerne Pferd. Ravensburg: Ravensburger Buchvlg. 1984. 
Runer Jonsson: Wickie und die Stadt der Tyrannen. Ravensburg: Ravensburger Buchvlg. 1984.

Secondary literature (German) 
Ina Kurth/Joachim Schmaeck: Wickie und der dänische Zoll. Arbeiten mit Anteilen und Prozenten. Appelhülsen/Mülheim: Verlag "Die Schulpraxis". 1990. 
Susanne Pauser/Wolfgang Ritschl: Wickie, Slime und Paiper. Wien: Böhlau. 1999. 
Wickie und die starken Männer, Kinderkochbuch. Frechen: Schwager & Steinlein. 2001. 
Wickie und die starken Männer - Pop-Up Masken Spielbuch. Frechen: Schwager & Steinlein. 2003. 
Wickie und die starken Männer - Geschichtenbuch. Fränkisch-Crumbach: Verlag EDITION XXL. 2003. 
Wickie - Stanzpappe Buch Fränkisch-Crumbach: Verlag EDITION XXL. 2004.

References

External links 
 
 
(German)
 Wickie auf Großer Fahrt Film Homepage
 fernsehserien.de: Episodenführer
(Japanese)
Official Homepage

1974 anime television series debuts
1974 German television series debuts
1974 German television series endings
1974 Japanese television series debuts
1975 Japanese television series endings
Adventure anime and manga
Animated television series about children
Australian Broadcasting Corporation original programming
British children's animated adventure television series
British children's animated comedy television series
Fictional Vikings
Fuji TV original programming
German children's animated adventure television series
German children's animated comedy television series
German-language television shows
ITV children's television shows
Japanese children's animated adventure television series
Japanese children's animated comedy television series
Male characters in animation
Nippon Animation
Television series set in the Viking Age
Television shows adapted into films
Television shows based on children's books
ZDF original programming